Coolwort or cool-wort can refer to a number of plants including:

Coolwort, Sullivantia 	
Hapeman's coolwort, Sullivantia hapemanii or Sullivantia hapemanii var. hapemanii		
Oregon coolwort, Sullivantia oregana 		
Sullivant's coolwort, Sullivantia sullivantii
Coolwort, Tiarella
White coolwort, Tiarella cordifolia
Coolwort, Pilea pumila
False coolwort, Bolandra	
Sierra false coolwort, Bolandra californica		
Northern false coolwort, Bolandra oregana